Friedrich Hermann Leuchs (8 August 1879 – 2 May 1945) was a German chemist.

Life
Leuchs studied chemistry at the University of Munich from 1898. He transferred to the University of Berlin and received his Ph.D. there in 1902 under Emil Fischer. He steadily advanced in the hierarchy of the university, becoming a lecturer in 1910, assistant professor in 1914, and full professor in 1916. The ministry of education assured him that he would succeed Wilhelm Schlenk as head of the chemistry institute of the University of Berlin, but this never happened. His personality became strongly misanthropic. The Nazi regime, World War II and the destruction of Berlin increased his psychological problems, and shortly before the war ended he committed suicide in his flat in Berlin. This happened most likely on 2 May 1945. He was buried in a mass grave with numerous soldiers and citizens.

Work
Leuchs's research dealt with the chemistry of amino acids and the chemistry of strychnine. The Leuchs reaction and the Leuchs anhydride were named after him.

References 

 Historical notes from the  Humboldt-Universität
 

1879 births
1945 deaths
20th-century German chemists
Organic chemists
Scientists from Nuremberg
Suicides in Germany
Academic staff of the Humboldt University of Berlin
1945 suicides